Stéphane Brizé (born 18 October 1966) is a French film director, producer, screenwriter and actor.

Life and career
Stéphane Brizé was born on 18 October 1966 in Rennes, France. He attended a University Institutes of Technology and moved to Paris, where he started his career in theater and television, before moving on to short films and feature films. His 2015 film The Measure of a Man was selected to compete for the Palme d'Or at the 2015 Cannes Film Festival.

Filmography

References

External links

 

Living people
1966 births
Actors from Rennes
French male film actors
French film directors
French male screenwriters
French screenwriters
French film producers
Mass media people from Rennes